Princess Eléonore of Belgium (Eléonore Fabiola Victoria Anne Marie; born 16 April 2008) is the younger daughter and the youngest of four children of King Philippe and Queen Mathilde of Belgium. She is currently fourth in line to the throne of Belgium after her older siblings Princess Elisabeth, Duchess of Brabant, Prince Gabriel, and Prince Emmanuel.

Life
Princess Eléonore was born on 16 April 2008 at 4:50 at the Erasmus Hospital, the teaching hospital of Université libre de Bruxelles in Anderlecht.  She is the twelfth and youngest grandchild of King Albert II and Queen Paola.  She was baptised on 14 June 2008 in the chapel of Ciergnon Castle in the Belgian Ardennes, by Cardinal Godfried Danneels, the Archbishop of Mechelen-Brussels. Her godparents are Crown Princess Victoria of Sweden, Princess Claire of Belgium, and Count Sébastien von Westphalen zu Fürstenberg.

Princess Eléonore attended primary school at the Dutch speaking school Sint-Jan Berchmanscollege in central Brussels. As of September 2020, she attends Heilig Hart College, a Dutch language secondary school in the Wezembeek-Oppem. French and English are also part of her education, she lives with her parents, her sister Elisabeth and her two brothers Gabriel and Emmanuel at the Royal Palace of Laeken.

Princess Eléonore plays the violin. She likes reading and drawing. She likes to practice cycling, swimming, skiing and sailing.

Arms

References

External links
 Biography on the Belgian Monarchy official website

2008 births
Living people
Belgian princesses
People from Anderlecht
Princesses of Saxe-Coburg and Gotha
House of Belgium
Royal children
Belgian people of Danish descent
Belgian people of German descent
Belgian people of Italian descent
Belgian people of Polish descent
Belgian people of Swedish descent
Daughters of kings